Fredrik Klock (born 3 September 1981) is a retired Norwegian footballer.

He earlier played with Brann in the Norwegian Premier League. He debuted in a Royal League game against Halmstad BK on 24 February 2005. He signed a three-year-long contract with IL Hødd 8 February 2006.

Honours

Club

 Hødd
Norwegian Football Cup (1): 2012

References

1981 births
Living people
Norwegian footballers
Aalesunds FK players
SK Brann players
IL Hødd players
Sportspeople from Ålesund
Eliteserien players
Association football defenders